Thorsten Rund (born 25 February 1976 in Lübben) is a German former professional road and track cyclist. He competed in the points race at the 2000 Summer Olympics. He also rode in the 2003 Vuelta a España, finishing 142nd overall.

Major results

1993
 UCI Junior Track World Championships
1st  Team pursuit
1st  Points race
3rd  Individual pursuit
1994
 2nd  Individual pursuit, UCI Junior Track World Championships
1995
 2nd Team pursuit, National Track Championships
1996
 3rd  Team pursuit, UCI Track World Championships
1998
 2nd Madison, National Track Championships
1999
 National Track Championships
1st  Madison (with Guido Fulst)
2nd Team pursuit
 1st Stage 5 Volta a Tarragona
2000
 3rd Team pursuit, National Track Championships
2004
 3rd Team pursuit, National Track Championships
 9th Rund um die Nürnberger Altstadt

References

External links 

1976 births
Living people
People from Lübben (Spreewald)
German male cyclists
Cyclists at the 2000 Summer Olympics
Olympic cyclists of Germany
German track cyclists
Cyclists from Brandenburg
People from Bezirk Cottbus